James Alexander L. S. Wong (born 26 May 1981) is a British ethnobotanist, television presenter and garden designer. He is best known for presenting the award-winning series Grow Your Own Drugs and the BBC and PBS series Secrets of Your Food, as well as being a panelist on the Radio 4 series Gardeners' Question Time.

Early life
Born at St Bartholomew's Hospital in the City of London to a Bornean father and a Welsh mother from Newport, Wong was brought up in Singapore and Malaysia. Upon being awarded an academic scholarship, he returned to the UK in 1999 to study at the University of Bath, where he took a BSc in Business Administration. He then trained at the Royal Botanic Gardens, Kew, and the University of Kent, gaining a Master of Science degree in ethnobotany, graduating with distinction.

Career
At the age of 27, Wong became the presenter of his own television series Grow Your Own Drugs. The award-winning BBC Two series demonstrates a number of natural remedies sourced from plants, and soon became the highest-rated gardening series on UK television. The show ran for two series, as well as a one-off Christmas special, Grow Your Own Christmas. Wong's first two books that tied-in with each series of the television show became international best-sellers, with his third title Homegrown Revolution becoming the fastest selling gardening book in UK history.

Wong is also a regular reporter on the hit BBC One rural affairs series Countryfile since its reformatting in April 2009, as well as being a regular panellist on BBC Radio 4's Gardeners' Question Time, and presenter of the Channel NewsAsia series Expensive Eats.

In his capacity as a garden designer, he has become a four-time Royal Horticultural Society medal winner for gardens he co-designed through the design studio he co-founded, Amphibian Designs, at the Chelsea Flower Show and the Hampton Court Palace Flower Show. In his first garden at the 2004 Hampton Court Palace Flower Show, he became the youngest-ever medal-winning designer at the event, and is currently the youngest five-time RHS medal winner.

Wong has designed an Ethnobotanical Garden for the University of Kent, where he is a guest lecturer.

His research has taken him to highland Ecuador, as well as to China and Java.

In 2013 and 2014, he presented several episodes of Great British Garden Revival, winning Best Television Programme of the Year at the 2014 Garden Media Awards.

In September 2015, Wong started writing a weekly column in The Observer; in February 2023 he announced that he had resigned from the column, after writing to the editorial department and tweeting to describe as "completely unacceptable" a column by Catherine Bennett whose headline likened politicians who support trans rights to alleged sex trafficker Andrew Tate in the context of the Gender Recognition Reform (Scotland) Bill and which mentioned Rosie Duffield, Joanna Cherry and Miriam Cates by name, criticising comments by Lloyd Russell-Moyle and Ben Bradshaw.

Personal life
Wong lives in central London. Wong retains a slight southern Welsh accent from his mother.

Filmography

Bibliography

References

External links
 James Wong's Official Site
 James Wong's Official Blog
 Amphibian Designs – a garden design studio co-founded by James Wong
   Manchester Evening News – Nature boy James Wong
 Grow your own drugs: an interview with James Wong – The Ecologist 2 July 2009
 Burgbad Presents Endangered Plant Sanctuary At The Rhs Hampton Court Palace Flower Show, July 2008

Living people
1981 births
Alumni of the University of Bath
Alumni of the University of Kent
English botanists
English gardeners
English people of Chinese descent
English people of Malaysian descent
English people of Welsh descent
English television presenters
Ethnobotanists
Malaysian people of Welsh descent
People from the City of London